Another Mind is the debut release from Hiromi Uehara, a jazz and jazz fusion pianist. It was released in 2003 and received the award for foreign jazz album of the year in the 2004 Japan Annual Gold Disc Awards.

Reception
Peter Marsh of BBC stated "Surrounding herself with a cast of young, gifted musicians (and a slightly older one in the shape of the great bassist Anthony Jackson), 24 year old Hiromi Uehara's music is audacious, hyperactive stuff. Sticking mainly to acoustic piano, her approach is reminiscent of Oscar Peterson on steroids. Few of the instrument's 88 keys remain untouched for long." Robert L. Calder of PopMatters stated "he name that comes to mind is tsunami, or some other earthquake and volcano jargon term. Quite simply, I've heard no more powerful jazz pianist than Hiromi Uehara. Current competition includes the Russian Simon Nabatov (the Slavonic Jaki Byard) as well as Brad Mehldau (I've not heard of Bobby Enriquez in some time, but her fingers punch as hard as his fists and elbows)." Phil Dipietro of All About Jazz wrote "Yes, Hiromi's music is full of emotion, drawing freely and effortlessly from the panorama of influences, most of them adventurous in aspect and application. But please, let's not downplay Ms. Uehara's abilities as a pure technician!"

Track listing
All songs composed by Hiromi

 XYZ (5:37)      
 Double Personality (11:57)
 Summer Rain (6:07)       
 Joy (8:29)     
 010101 (Binary System) - (8:23)     
 Truth and Lies (7:20)  
 Dançando no Paraiso (7:39)     
 Another Mind (8:44) 
 The Tom and Jerry Show (6:05)

Personnel 
 Hiromi Uehara - Piano
 Mitch Cohn - Bass (1-3, 6, 8)
 Dave DiCenso - Drums

with guests:
 Anthony Jackson - Bass (4, 5, 7)
 Jim Odgren - Alto saxophone (2, 3)
 David Fiuczynski - Guitar (2)

Production 
 Producer - Richard Evans, Ahmad Jamal
 Executive Producer - Robert Woods
 Production Supervisor - Erica Brenner
 Editing - Michael Bishop, Todd Brown
 Engineer - Michael Bishop, Ahmad Jamal
 Assistant Engineer - Peter Doris, Aya Takemura
 Art Direction - Anilda Carrasquillo
 Design - Anilda Carrasquillo
 Photography - Mark L. Baer
 Make-Up - Maria Ponsiano
 Liner Notes - Hiromi Uehara

References

External links
Official website

2003 debut albums
Post-bop albums
Hiromi Uehara albums